N,N-Dimethylethylamine (DMEA), sometimes referred to as dimethylethylamine, is an organic compound with formula (CH3)2NC2H5. It is an industrial chemical that is mainly used in foundries as a catalyst for epoxy resins and polyurethane as well as sand core production.   Dimethylethylamine is a malodorous, volatile liquid at room temperature that is excreted at greater concentrations with larger dietary intake of trimethylamine.

See also
 Odorant
 Olfactory receptor
 Trace amine
 Trace amine-associated receptor

References

Foul-smelling chemicals
Dimethylamino compounds